PAW Patrol is a Canadian CGI–animated television series created by Keith Chapman. It is produced by Spin Master Entertainment, with animation provided by Guru Studio. In Canada, the series is primarily broadcast on TVOntario, which first ran previews of the show in August 2013. The series premiered on Nickelodeon in the United States on August 12, 2013.

Series overview

Episodes

Season 1 (2013–14)

Season 2 (2014–15)

Season 3 (2015–17)

Season 4 (2017–18)

Season 5 (2018–19)

Season 6 (2019–21)

Season 7 (2020–21)

Season 8 (2021–22)

Season 9 (2022–23)

Season 10 (2023–present)

Specials

PAW Patrol Original 5s (Shorts) (2020–22)

Theatrical movies

References

Lists of Nickelodeon television series episodes
Lists of Canadian children's animated television series episodes